Ryan Wang  is a Canadian pianist. He has performed at Carnegie Hall and was featured on The Ellen DeGeneres Show.

Early life and education 
Wang is from West Vancouver. He began playing piano at age four. In 2013, at the age of five, he performed at Carnegie Hall. In September 2014, he began studying piano with professor Lee Kum-Sing at the Vancouver Academy of Music. Currently, he is studying on a music scholarship with Mr. Gareth Owen at Eton College. He is also in the Artist Diploma program with Prof. Marian Rybicki at the École Normale de Musique de Paris.

Career
Ryan has recorded for radio stations as well as performed at Carnegie Hall, on the Ellen deGeneres Show, Fazioli Concert Hall, RTHK radio 4 in HongKong, CCTV 4 (China), CBC Music and live on FM96.3 Toronto’s Radio Station at Zoomer Hall. He has performed solo recitals in Italy, China, Hong Kong, Japan, Singapore, Malaysia, Canada, USA, Poland and the UK. As a soloist, he has performed with the Singapore Symphony Orchestra, Singapore Chinese Orchestra, Toronto Festival Orchestra, Xiamen Philharmonic Orchestra, Vancouver Metropolitan Orchestra, and the West Coast Symphony Orchestra.

Awards
Among his awards are the First Prize and Judges Distinction in the American Protégé Piano and Strings competition and the AADGT Passion of Music Competition as well as wins in the 2014 Canadian Music Competition, 2019 Seattle International Piano Competition, 2019 Edith Lando Gifted Youth Competition, 2021 Young Euregio Piano Award Competition, 2021 Gustav Mahler Piano Competition, the 29th International Fryderyk Chopin Piano Competition for Youth in Szafarnia Poland, 2022 Chicago International Music Competition, 2022 Paderewski International Piano Competition, and the 2022 International Piano Competition ‘SAMSON FRANCOIS’. From 2015 to 2019, Wang participated in the Casalmaggiore International Music Festival in Italy where he gave solo recitals and performed concertos with the Festival Orchestra. He was the recipient of the Gabora Prize in 2017 and the Audience Favorite Award of Best Musician in 2019. In 2017 and 2019, Wang was the recipient of the Emerging Artist Grant from the Vancouver Academy of Music.

References

Year of birth missing (living people)
Living people
21st-century Canadian pianists
Collingwood School alumni